This article shows all participating team squads at the 2008 Volleyball America's Cup, held from September 24 to September 28 in Cuiabá, Brazil.

United States
Head Coach: Ron Larsen

Volleyball America's Cup squads
2008 in volleyball